Vitor Hugo da Silva Gonçalves (born 24 February 2004), known as Vitor Hugo or Vitinho, is a Brazilian professional footballer who plays as a forward for Goiás.

Club career
Born in Itaberaí, Goiás, Vitor Hugo joined Goiás' youth setup in 2021, from hometown side AA Vasco de Itaberaí. On 9 February 2022, he signed his first professional contract with the club.

Vitor Hugo made his first team – and Série A – debut on 15 June 2022, coming on as a late substitute for Vinícius in a 2–1 home loss against Internacional.

Career statistics

References

External links
 Futebol de Goyaz profile 

2004 births
Living people
Sportspeople from Goiás
Brazilian footballers
Association football forwards
Campeonato Brasileiro Série A players
Goiás Esporte Clube players